Offender(s) or The Offender(s) may refer to:

A criminal, one who commits a criminal offense
Offender (film),  a 2012 British action film
Offenders (2017 film), a Serbian drama film
Offenders (comics), a Marvel Comics team
The Offenders (1921 film), a 1921 American melodrama film
The Offenders (1980 film), a 1980 American No Wave film 
The Offenders, the working title of The Outlaws (2021 TV series)
The Offenders (TV special), a canceled crossover animated special planned at Hulu

See also

Offense (disambiguation)
Offensive (disambiguation)